The Colts' flagship station from 1984 to 1998 and again starting in the 2007 season is WIBC 1070AM (renamed WFNI as of December 26, 2007); under the new contract, games are simulcast on WLHK 97.1 FM. From 1998 through 2006, the Colts' flagship station was WFBQ 94.7FM (with additional programming on WNDE 1260AM). Matt Taylor is the team's play-by-play announcer, holding that title since 2018 following Bob Lamey's retirement. Former Colts defensive coordinator and interim coach Rick Venturi is the color commentator, and Larra Overton joined as sideline reporter in 2019.

JJ Stankevitz became the team's public address announcer in 2022, replacing Mike Jansen, who had held the job since 1998.

Indianapolis Colts radio announcers

Prior to the 2021 season, the AM frequency of WFNI went dark; however, its simulcast on WFNI's repeater stations at 93.5 FM and 107.5 FM continued, alongside WLHK's broadcasts.

Baltimore Colts radio announcers

References

 
Indianapolis Colts
broadcasters